Shigeo Kaoku (加奥 成雄, born 29 July 1942) is a retired Japanese field hockey player, who won a bronze medal at the 1966 Asian Games. He competed at the 1964 and 1968 Olympics and finished in 7th and 13th place, respectively.

References

External links
 

1942 births
Living people
Japanese male field hockey players
Olympic field hockey players of Japan
Field hockey players at the 1964 Summer Olympics
Field hockey players at the 1968 Summer Olympics
Asian Games medalists in field hockey
Field hockey players at the 1966 Asian Games
Asian Games bronze medalists for Japan
Medalists at the 1966 Asian Games
20th-century Japanese people